Full Contact is a 2015 Dutch-Croatian drama film directed by David Verbeek. It was shown in the Platform section of the 2015 Toronto International Film Festival.

Premise

Presented in two chapters, a French drone pilot flies drones in the Middle East from Nevada in the United States. He carries out a drone strike on a building to kill a terrorist inside, but he discovers afterward that the building was a school for boys.

Cast
 Grégoire Colin as Ivan
 Lizzie Brocheré as Cindy
 Slimane Dazi as Al Zaim
 Alain Blazevic as Colonel Hendrix
 Robert Jozinovic as Van Patton
 Zvon Munivrana as Priest

See also
List of films featuring drones

References

External links
 

2015 films
2015 drama films
2010s English-language films
2010s French-language films
2015 multilingual films
Dutch drama films
Croatian drama films
Dutch multilingual films
Croatian multilingual films